Emanuel Domingo Guevara Arguello (born 7 February 1989 in San Luis, Argentina) is an Argentine former professional cyclist.

Major results
2013
1st Stage 5 Tour de San Luis

References

External links

1989 births
Living people
Argentine male cyclists
People from San Luis, Argentina
21st-century Argentine people